Bor-ming Jahn (24 August 1940 – 1 December 2016) was a Taiwanese-French geochemist.

Born in Miaoli on 24 August 1940, Jahn graduated from Hsinchu Senior High School and attended National Taiwan University, where, in 1963, he earned a bachelor's degree in geology. He obtained a master's degree in geochemistry from Brown University in 1967, and completed a doctorate at the University of Minnesota in 1972. After postdoctoral work and further research at NASA and the Lunar Science Institute, Jahn moved to France and joined the University of Rennes I faculty in 1976. Jahn acquired French nationality in May 1980. In 2003, he returned to Taiwan, serving as distinguished research fellow affiliated with the Institute of Earth Sciences, Academia Sinica from August 2004 to 2010. He left Academia Sinica to take an appointment at NTU, as distinguished chair professor of the department of geosciences. Between 2006 and 2016, Jahn was chief editor of the Journal of Asian Earth Sciences.

Over the course of his career, Jahn was granted fellowship by the Mineralogical Society of America and Geological Society of America in 2004, followed by the Geochemical Society and European Association of Geochemistry in 2006. In 2012, Jahn was elected a member of Academia Sinica. The next year, the French government named Jahn a chevalier of the ordre des Palmes Académiques. In 2016, the Geological Society of America awarded Jahn honorary fellow status. He died on 1 December 2016, at the Taipei Veterans General Hospital.

References

1940 births
2016 deaths
21st-century Taiwanese scientists
Taiwanese geochemists
Taiwanese emigrants to France
People with acquired French citizenship
French geochemists
National Taiwan University alumni
Academic staff of the National Taiwan University
Academic staff of the University of Rennes
Members of Academia Sinica
Fellows of the Geological Society of America
Academic journal editors
Chevaliers of the Ordre des Palmes Académiques
People from Miaoli County
20th-century Taiwanese scientists
20th-century geologists
21st-century geologists
20th-century chemists
21st-century chemists
Brown University alumni